18 Camelopardalis is a yellow-white-hued star in the northern circumpolar constellation of Camelopardalis. It has an apparent visual magnitude is 6.44, which makes it a challenge to view with the naked eye. Using the measured annual parallax shift of 23.02 mas, its distance can be estimated at around 142 light-years. The star is moving away from the Sun with a radial velocity of +33 km/s and has an annual proper motion of 0.251 arcseconds.

The spectrum of this star matches a stellar classification of F8 V, indicating this is an ordinary F-type main-sequence star. It is around 5.3 billion years old and is spinning with a projected rotational velocity of 5 km/s. The star has 1.2 times the mass of the Sun, 1.93 times the Sun's radius, and has near solar abundances of elements. The star is radiating 4.24 times the Sun's luminosity from its photosphere at an effective temperature of 5,908 K.

References

F-type main-sequence stars
Solar-type stars
Camelopardalis (constellation)
Durchmusterung objects
Camelopardalis, 18
036066
025973
1828